"The Encounter" is episode 151 of the American television series The Twilight Zone. First broadcast on May 1, 1964, its racial overtones caused it to be withheld from syndication in the U.S. until 2004.

Opening narration

Plot
Digging through his attic, an American World War II veteran named Fenton finds an old samurai sword. A young Japanese American named Arthur Takamori comes in looking for work, on a tip from a neighbor. Fenton is gruff yet cordial, and invites Takamori to share a beer with him in his cluttered attic. Fenton makes a remark about the incongruity between his first name and his obvious ethnicity. Arthur takes offense at first, but when it becomes apparent that Fenton meant no harm he admits that he changed his name from Taro. Fenton shows Takamori a samurai sword and says he took it off a Japanese soldier whom he killed during the war 20 years earlier. When Fenton leaves to fetch more beer, Takamori takes hold of the sword and says in an astonished way "I'm going to kill him. I'm going to kill him. Why?"

Fenton says he has repeatedly tried to sell, give away, or throw out the sword, but it always comes back. He has had the inscription on it translated: "The sword will avenge me". Seemingly despite himself, Fenton continues to speak in a racially offensive manner, such as addressing Takamori as "boy." Takamori grows more uneasy and more confrontational to match Fenton's increasing hostility. They have brief heated exchanges that cool but then reemerge. While recounting how he got the sword, Fenton appears to suffer a post traumatic flashback. They assume an adversarial posture, and Takamori challenges Fenton with the sword. This tension, too, subsides, though Takamori, seeming to gain some kind of supernatural insight from the sword, says Fenton killed the Japanese soldier after the soldier surrendered. Fenton challenges the accusation, but then admits to it. Intensely uneasy now, Takamori tries to leave but the door to the attic won't open for either him or Fenton, even though it doesn't have a lock.

In response to an insult from Fenton, Takamori describes his experience as a small child at Pearl Harbor. His father was a construction foreman who helped build the harbor. Takamori watched as the planes bombed the harbor, and his father with it. He first states his father tried to alert sailors to the attack, but then confesses that his father was actually a traitor who directed where the planes should drop the bombs. Seeing Takamori's guilt, Fenton tries to offer some comfort. The sword, however, appears to be dictating the course of the conversation, and soon Takamori accuses Fenton of being a murderer because he killed an unarmed man. Fenton defends himself by saying his orders were to take no prisoners, and he had been trained to think of Japanese as inhuman.

In a sudden depression, Fenton admits that he is unhappy with himself and what he has done. He has lost his job, his wife is leaving him, he is consumed with hostility and bigotry, and he coaxed Takamori into conversation because he does not want to be left alone. But Takamori, now thoroughly under the controlling influence of the sword, poises to kill Fenton. Fenton seizes him by his sword arm and overpowers him, and the samurai sword is dropped, wedging into the table supports, pointing upward. Going down to the floor to retrieve it, Fenton is then fatally impaled on the sword when Takamori pulls at his feet. Takamori takes the sword, shrieks "Banzai!" and jumps out the window, presumably to his death.

Moments later, the first floor door slowly opens on its own.

Closing narration

References
DeVoe, Bill. (2008). Trivia from The Twilight Zone. Albany, GA: Bear Manor Media. 
Grams, Martin. (2008). The Twilight Zone: Unlocking the Door to a Television Classic. Churchville, MD: OTR Publishing. 

Specific

External links
 
 Actor George Takei interview where he discusses The Encounter

1964 American television episodes
Television episodes about World War II
The Twilight Zone (1959 TV series season 5) episodes
Television episodes pulled from general rotation
Television episodes about racism
Race-related controversies in television
Television controversies in the United States